Fred A. Graber (January 4, 1895 – March 22, 1950) was an American businessman and politician from New York.

Life
He was born on January 4, 1895, in New York City, the son of Fred A. Graber and Elizabeth (Kaiser) Graber (died 1950). The family removed to Irvington, Westchester County, New York in 1900, and he attended the public school and high school there. From 1912 to 1922, he worked for the New York Central Railroad as a clerk in the freight audit office. On July 30, 1917, he married Mildred Ruth McBride, and their only child was Fred A. Graber Jr. During World War I he served in the U.S. Army. In 1922, he became a partner in an ice-cream wholesale and retail business in Tarrytown.

He was a trustee of Tarrytown from 1933 to 1940; Mayor of Tarrytown from 1941 to 1944; and a member of the New York State Assembly (Westchester Co., 2nd D.) from 1945 until his death in 1950, sitting in the 165th, 166th and 167th New York State Legislatures.

He was found dead in the morning of March 22, 1950, the last day of the annual legislative session, in his bed at the DeWitt Clinton Hotel in Albany, New York. He had died during the night of a heart attack.

References

1895 births
1950 deaths
Republican Party members of the New York State Assembly
People from Tarrytown, New York
Mayors of places in New York (state)
People from Irvington, New York
20th-century American politicians